Erik Eriksson of Spraxkya, in Borlänge, Dalarna, (1864–1939), was a Swedish politician. He was the first chairman of the Centre Party, but not its founder.

1864 births
1939 deaths
Centre Party (Sweden) politicians
People from Borlänge Municipality